Dallata was a Palestinian Arab village, located on a hilltop  north of Safad. Constructed upon an ancient site, it was known to the Crusaders as Deleha. Dallata was included in the late 16th century Ottoman census and British censuses of the 20th century. Its inhabitants were primarily agriculturalists, with some involved in carpentry or trade.

Dallata was depopulated during the 1948 Palestine war on around May 10, 1948 by the Palmach's First Battalion of Operation Yiftach.

History
Dallata was located on the upper slope of a hill, built on the ruins of an ancient occupied site. Excavations have found remains of settlements and agricultural installation from the Chalcolithic and  Early Bronze Age. Tombs had been located in the vicinity.

An excavation carried out in 2006 on a location halfway between the center of Dallata and the new Israeli settlement of Dalton, found alluvial soil that contained worn Late Roman and Byzantine potsherds.

The village was referred to by the Crusaders as Deleha.  Mamluk remains have also been found.

Ottoman era
In 1517, the village  was incorporated into the Ottoman Empire with the rest of Palestine, and in 1596 the village appeared in the  tax registers as  being in the  nahiya (subdistrict)  of Jira,   (part of Safad Sanjak), with an estimated population of 127. The inhabitants paid taxes on wheat, barley, olives,  goats, beehives, vineyards, and a press for processing grapes or olives; a total of 4416 Akçe. All the inhabitants were Muslim.

In 1662, it was mentioned as a place of Jewish graves, while in  1838 Delata was noted as a village located in the Safad district.

In 1875 Victor Guérin visited, and noted that all the inhabitants were Muslim. In 1881, the PEF's Survey of Western Palestine (SWP) noted the village had about 100 Muslim residents. There were a few gardens around the village, and  water was supplied from a well and a birket. The villagers worked primarily in agriculture throughout its history, and some worked in carpentry and trade.

A population list from about 1887 showed  Dalata to have  about  355 Muslim  inhabitants.

The 2006 excavation found  a structure dating to the Late Ottoman Period.

British Mandate era
In the 1922 census of Palestine conducted by the British Mandate authorities, Dallatha  had a population of 204, all Muslims,  increasing in the 1931 census to 256, still all  Muslims,  in  a total of 43  houses.

In  the 1945 statistics, it had a population of 360, all Muslims, with a total of 9072 Dunams of land. Of this, 3,651  was allocated to cereal, 302 were used for orchards, while 36 dunams were classified as built-up (urban) land. The village had a small school which had an enrollment of 37 students in 1945.

1948, and aftermath
Dallata was depopulated in the 1947–1948 Civil War in Mandatory Palestine. The Israeli historian Benny Morris writes that the date and cause of the depopulation is unknown,
while Walid Khalidi assumes it was occupied some time after the fall of the district capital of Safed, 10–11 May 1948. According to Khalidi, the indirect evidence points to the village being seized during Operation Yiftach, and, in that case, it was probably one of the villages attacked in the latter stages of the operation, like neighboring ‘Ammuqa, which was occupied on 24 May. The American historian Rosemarie Esber reports that Dallata was one of the villages that locals fled to in the first days of May 1948, when Fir'im, Mughr al-Khayt and Qabba'a were attacked with mortars by Israeli forces. Esber gives the depopulation date as 10 May 1948, and the causes twofold: "Direct mortar attacks on civilians, siege, shooting at fleeing Arabs", and "Terror raids, house demolitions, sniping, hostage-taking, looting, destruction of crop and livestock."

In 1950 after the 1948 war, the settlement of Dalton was established by the Israelis about 1 km southwest of the village site, on village land.

The Palestinian historian Walid Khalidi described the village remains in 1992: "All that remains are the debris of the houses scattered across the site, partly covered by grass, shrubs, and trees. A few stone terraces on village land are still intact, and some olive trees still grow. About 1 km south of the site lies the Israeli settlement of Dalton"

In 2000, a  117-page book was published about Dallata. Included in it was ten pages on the families of the village, listing the father and sons and where they were living  in 2000.

References

Bibliography

  

 
 

 
 
 

  
 
 
 (pp.  5-6)

External links
Welcome To Dallata
Dallata, at Zochrot
Survey of Western Palestine, Map 4: IAA, Wikimedia commons
Dallata, at Khalil Sakakini Cultural Center
Dallata, Dr. Khalil Rizk.

Arab villages depopulated during the 1948 Arab–Israeli War
District of Safad